The 1917 Great Ankara Fire caused extensive damage to the Turkish city of Ankara on September 15, 1917. Areas affected included the Hisarönü, Çıkrıkçılar Yokuşu, Bedesten, Saraçlar Bazaar and Atpazarı. It is estimated that up to 1,900 people lost their lives in the fire. The 1917 fire was part of successive fires which occurred in 20 provinces of Turkey in the span of three years.  After the fire, only two mosques and seven churches remained in Ankara.

References

Events in Ankara
1917 fires in Europe
Fires in Turkey
20th century in Ankara
Urban fires in Asia